Hirachand Punamchand v Temple [1911] 2 KB 330 is often cited as one of the exceptions to the accord and satisfaction rule laid out in Foakes v Beer. In that case, it is held that an agreement to accept part payment of a debt cannot validly discharge the entire debt. In Hirachand Punamchand v Temple, part payment of a debt is held to be valid because it is supplied by a third party and not the debtor (originally established in Cook v Lister (1863) 13 CBNS 543).

Background
The defendant, Lieutenant Temple had gotten indebted to money lenders (plaintiffs) issuing them a promissory note; after no money was forthcoming from Lieutenant Temple, the plaintiffs approached his father, Sir Richard Carnac Temple, 2nd Baronet, and asked him to pay the debt for him. Sir Richard in reply, got his solicitors to send the moneylender a cheque for 1,500 rupees, which was less than the full amount owed, with a letter attached that this was tendered as a "full settlement of his son’s account".

The money lenders cashed the cheque but then proceeded to sue the debtor (Lieutenant Temple) for the outstanding balance.

Held
The Court of Appeal ruled that the defendant was not liable for the remaining balance owed to the moneylender.

Fletcher Moulton LJ said in the ruling:

The net effect of the father's intervention was to essentially extinguish the original credit note; in the words of Vaughan Williams LJ:

He had previously said (regarding the draft):

Thus arriving at an essentially similar position to that of Willes J in Cook v Lister (1863) 13 CBNS 543 (in which he expressed the view that the "effect of such as agreement between a creditor and a third party with regard to the debt is to render it impossible for the creditor afterwards to sue the debtor for it") but by virtue of rather different reasoning.

References

1911 in British law
Court of Appeal (England and Wales) cases
1911 in case law